The Tablas drongo (Dicrurus menagei) is an Asian bird of the family Dicruridae. It was formerly considered conspecific with the hair-crested drongo. 

It is endemic to Tablas Island in the Philippines. It is noted by its jet black plumage with a long fish-like tail. It inhabits tropical old-growth forest. Prior to 1998, it was not seen for many decades due to lack of surveys on the island. It is estimated to consist of just 50 to 250 mature adults making it one of the most endangered birds in the Philippines. It is threatened by habitat loss.

Description and Taxonomy 
EBird describes the bird as "A medium-sized, long-tailed bird of forest canopy on Tablas, where it is the only drongo in range. Entirely black with glossy-blue wings, crown, and streaks on the neck and chest. Similar to Philippine Drongo-Cuckoo but larger, with a thicker bill and a strongly forked tail with upturned tips. Not as vocal as other drongos. Voice includes a grating scold followed by a loud, high-pitched whistle." 

It is insectivorous, catching prey by hawking and foraging among leaves and on trunks. The species's nest is described as a small cup made of thin twigs and vegetation fibres, coarsely woven into a three-quarters sphere and suspended from slender branches amongst foliage in the outer part of a tall tree, high above a stream. 

The specific name, menagei, commemorates Louis F. Menage, an American real estate tycoon.

Habitat and Conservation Status 
The species inhabits tropical moist lowland primary forest in areas with mature closed-canopy forest. Occasional sightings from the edge of clearings but is not found in fully cleared areas.  Observed in the mid-canopy of tall trees, often near streams. 

The IUCN Red List classifies this bird as an endangered species with population estimates of 50 to 250 mature individuals. This species' main threat is habitat loss with wholesale clearance of forest habitats as a result of legal and illegal logging, and conversion into farmlands through Slash-and-burn and other methods.The species does not occur at high density even within the little remaining forest cover on Tablas:

Mt Palaupau serves as a watershed for Tablas Island. 

There are no species specific conservation programs going on at the moment but conservation actions proposed include more species surveys to better understand habitat and population. initiate education and awareness campaigns to raise the species's profile and instill pride in locals. Lobby for protection of remaining forest and assess feasibility of reforestation projects,

References

Tablas drongo
Endemic birds of the Philippines
Fauna of Romblon
Tablas drongo
Tablas drongo